Hover Motorsports was a NASCAR Nextel Cup Series team. They last attempted a race at the 2006 Daytona 500, when they fielded the No. 80 Roadloans.com Ford Taurus for Carl Long, but failed to qualify. They were planning to partner with Peak Fitness Racing for the 2006 season, but that deal fell through. The team has also run races in the past in the ARCA RE/MAX Series.

Winston Cup 
Hover began racing NASCAR in 1992. The team made its first start at the AC Delco 500 with Dave Blaney driving with sponsorship from Daffron's Body Shop. He started 36th and finished 31st after suffering handling problems. Hover did not make another start until the 1994 Daytona 500, when the team finished 19th with Jimmy Horton driving. They also ran another race at Charlotte Motor Speedway with Joe Ruttman. He finished 23rd with Park Ohio Industries. Ruttman returned to run the 1995 Daytona 500, finishing nineteenth.

After Ruttman failed to qualify for the 1996 Daytona 500, Hover did not make another NASCAR attempt until the Daytona 500 in 1998, when Mike Ciochetti drove. He too did not make the field. Andy Hillenburg attempted Daytona with Hover in 1999, missing the race as well. Gary Bradberry came on board for a pair of races in 1999, failing to qualify for those. Following the 1999 season, Hover constructed a new shop and hired Morgan Shepherd to attempt the Brickyard 400, but he too, fell short of qualifying for the race. After he DNQ'd for Daytona in 2001, he was released.

In 2002, Hover returned with sponsorship from Hooters and Kirk Shelmerdine driving. When Shelmerdine DNQ'd at Daytona, he and Hooters left for Brett Bodine Racing, leaving the team once again driverless. They did not run in 2003, but returned in 2004 due to a lack of teams competing. With new sponsor Commercial Truck & Trailer, Hillenburg drove five races for them, posting a best finish of 34th at North Carolina Speedway. Following him, Randy LaJoie drove one race for them at Richmond International Raceway. Tony Ave, Carl Long, and Ted Christopher drove for one-race deals, before Mario Gosselin finished the season for the team.

The team would stir up controversy about field fillers, when during the 2004 Carolina Dodge Dealers 400, Andy Hillenburg, who was last at the time, was bumped by Tony Stewart heading into Turn 1, who was about to lap Hillenburg. Jeff Gordon, who was behind Stewart, could not slow down enough to avoid Hillenburg and eventually hit Hillenburg on the driver's side. Hillenburg said of the incident "I wiggled up in front of the, uh, the 20 car there and, uh, I mean... you know, you come in here and this is the big boys, and... a slow car and a fast car and... fast car hits the slow car and it's the slow car's fault and we'll go back and build us a faster car and some day we'll be back and be the faster car... I feel bad, it's a race car driver's worst nightmare to come out here and take out one of the heroes." Jeff Gordon, in a later interview at the race questioned if field fillers should be able to still compete in NASCAR, saying "I don't know what happened there with Andy getting spun, but I'll tell you what, there are a bunch of cars out there that do not belong out there. They're way off the pace. They're in the way. We almost had several wrecks before that, and I came on the radio and asked if NASCAR could take some guys off the track, not just because they're slow, but because they're in the way. This is a narrow, tight race track. It's a hard enough track to race with guys who are at speed. It's just frustrating right now... I think in qualifying, maybe there's a certain percent, like Formula One has a 107 percent rule. This is the NEXTEL Cup Series, man. I mean, this is the best of the best. We don't need to have cars there that are just out there making a qualifying attempt and making the race. We talk about it all the time. [NASCAR has] tried to address it with a minimum speed, but maybe the minimum speed needs to be adjusted. Everyone is caught up in this 43 cars [minimum grid size], but I don't care if there are 43 cars. I don't know if the people in the stands really care if there are 43 cars. We need cars out there that are competitive and that need to be out there competing for position, not just riding around."

Hover attempted the 2005 Daytona 500 with Andy Belmont driving with sponsorship from Bootie Beer, but the team did not qualify. A lack of sponsorship kept the team from competing until the Ford 400, when they ran with a Dodge Intrepid and Aaron's sponsorship, with Long driving. The team did not qualify after a wreck in qualifying. Long and Hover partnered again for the 2006 Daytona 500 with Roadloans sponsorship, but a sour engine caused them to miss the race. The team has been inactive since Roadloans departed, and the crew assisted Long and his No. 46 Cupp Motorsports team at the end of the season. The team would officially close in 2006.

Drivers
No drivers competed full-time for Hover Motorsports.
 Dave Blaney (1992)
 Jimmy Horton (1994 Daytona 500; DNQ in 1993 at Dover & Pocono in June, and Richmond in September, DNQ in 1994 at Atlanta, Talladega, & Michigan)
 Joe Ruttman (1994-1996; DNQ in 1994 at Daytona in July, Talladega, Richmond, & Atlanta, DNQ in 1995 at Indianapolis, DNQ for 1996 Daytona 500)
 Andy Hillenburg (limited races in 2004; DNQ for 1999 Daytona 500, DNQ in 2004 at Texas, Charlotte, & Pocono)
 Gary Bradberry (DNQ in 1999 at Indianapolis & Charlotte)
 Morgan Shepherd (DNQ for 2001 Daytona 500)
 Kirk Shelmerdine (DNQ for 2002 Daytona 500)
 Randy LaJoie (2004 at Richmond)
 Carl Long (2004; DNQ in 2004 at Richmond, Talladega, & Homestead, DNQ for 2006 Daytona 500)
 Tony Ave (2004 at Watkins Glen; also DNQ at Bristol)
 Ted Christopher (2004 at Loudon)
 Derrike Cope (DNQ in 2004 at Dover)
 Mario Gosselin (2004; also DNQ at Phoenix)
 Andy Belmont (DNQ in 2004 at Atlanta; for 2005 Daytona 500)

Motorsports career results

NASCAR
(key) (Bold – Pole position awarded by qualifying time. Italics – Pole position earned by points standings or practice time. * – Most laps led.)

Car No. 80 results

In popular culture 
Stan Hover Motorsports was featured in Episode 6 of YouTuber Brock Beard's Rise of the Field Fillers, a series dedicated to knowing the history of the so called "field fillers".
Footnotes

References

External links 
Official Website
Stan Hover Owner Statistics

American auto racing teams
ARCA Menards Series teams
Companies based in North Carolina
Defunct NASCAR teams
Defunct companies based in North Carolina
Auto racing teams established in 1992
Auto racing teams disestablished in 2006